L Lun Wa (also spelt L Lun War and L Loon War) is a Burmese pop singer of Kachin descent. He began pursuing a music career between the ages of 18 and 19, at the same time he was attending medical school at the University of Medicine 1, Yangon. He graduated from medical school, after a 4-year hiatus.

He was married to Khaing Su, and has two daughters, Mai Mai and Lu Lu. His aunt, L Khun Yi, was a prominent pop singer in the 1980s, while his cousin, L Seng Zi, is a pop singer.

Discography
 (2003)
 (2007)
 (2009)
 (2014)
 (2017)

References

External links
 
 

21st-century Burmese male singers
Living people
Burmese physicians
Burmese people of Kachin descent
Burmese pop singers
University of Medicine 2, Yangon alumni
1983 births